Praveen Kumar Nishad  (born 19 February 1989) is an Indian politician and a member of Bharatiya Janata Party. He is a member of Lok Sabha from Sant Kabir Nagar, Uttar Pradesh since 2019 elections. He is the son of Dr. Sanjay Nishad, founder of the NISHAD Party. He is an engineer with a degree from Gautam Buddh Technical University, Lucknow.

For the 2018 by-elections to Phulpur and Gorakhpur Lok Sabha seats, Samajwadi Party tied up with a number of smaller parties, including Nishad Party to extend its social base beyond Yadavs and Muslims. Praveen Kumar Nishad was selected as the Samajwadi candidate in Gorakhpur, where the Nishad community is the second largest demographic group. In a major upset, Praveen Nishad wrested the seat from BJP, which had not lost the seat since 1989. The victory margin was 21,000 votes. One year later, he joined BJP, and was elected to Lok Sabha in 2019 from Sant Kabir Nagar seat.

References

|-

1989 births
Living people
Samajwadi Party politicians
Uttar Pradesh politicians
India MPs 2019–present
Bharatiya Janata Party politicians from Uttar Pradesh
People from Gorakhpur district